is a national highway of Japan connecting Shimoda, Shizuoka and Numazu, Shizuoka in Japan, with a total length of 73.7 km (45.8 mi).

References

National highways in Japan
Roads in Shizuoka Prefecture